A percussionist is a musician who plays a percussion instrument. Although drummers and vibraphonists are considered percussionists, this list only includes percussionists known for playing a variety of percussion instruments. There is a separate list of drummers and list of vibraphonists. If a percussionist specializes in a particular instrument, it is listed in parentheses.

A

 Keiko Abe (marimba)
 Alex Acuña
 Charlie Adams
 Marc Anderson
 José Areas
 Frank Arsenault
 Okyerema Asante

B

 Lekan Babalola
 Manolo Badrena
 Ginger Baker
 Cyro Baptista
 Michael Alden Bayard
 Samm Bennett
 John Bergamo
 Cindy Blackman Santana
 Richard Bona
 John Bonham
 Gary Burton

C

 Candido Camero
 Michael Carabello
 Pedro Carneiro (marimba)
 Christoph Caskel
 Lenny Castro
 Pius Cheung (marimba)
 Mino Cinelu
 Frank Colón
 Luis Conte
 Bob Conti
 Ray Cooper
 Mayuto Correa
 Shawn Crahan (Slipknot)
 Colin Currie

D

 Paulinho Da Costa
 Rubem Dantas
 Josh Dun (Twenty One Pilots)

E

 Coke Escovedo
 Pete Escovedo
 Peter Michael Escovedo
 Sheila Escovedo
 Tony Esposito

F

 Chris Fehn (Slipknot)
 Victor Feldman
 Will Ferrell (Cowbell)
 Vic Firth
 Tristan Fry

G

 Steve Gadd
 Guille Garcia
 Peter Giger
 Evelyn Glennie
 Martin Grubinger
 Trilok Gurtu

H

 Jamey Haddad
 Bobbye Hall
 Lionel Hampton (vibraphone)
 Jason Hann
 Ralph Hardimon
 Mickey Hart (Drum)
 Giovanni Hidalgo (congas)
 Taku Hirano
 Marty Hurley
 Zakir Hussain

J

 Alex Jacobowitz (xylophone)

K

 Kalani
 Donald Knaack

L

 Joe Lala
 Jody Linscott
 Pete Lockett

M

 Ralph MacDonald
 Alex MacDougall
 Ed Mann
 Mitch Markovich
 Marilyn Mazur
 Othello Molineaux  (steel drums)
 Moondog
 Airto Moreira
 Luigi Morleo
 Katarzyna Mycka

N

 Andy Narell
 Hani Naser
 Max Neuhaus

O

 Babatunde Olatunji
 Laudir de Oliveira

P

 Morris Pert
 Morris Palter
 Neil Peart
 Lisa Pegher
 Richard Pelham
 Armando Peraza
 Mitchell Peters
 Joe Porcaro
 Chano Pozo
 Tito Puente

Q

 Taufiq Qureshi

R

 Layne Redmond
 Daniel de los Reyes
 Walfredo de los Reyes (also known as Walfredo de los Reyes, Sr.)
 Walfredo Reyes Jr. (also known as Walfredo de los Reyes, Jr.)
 Emil Richards
 Frank Ricotti
 John Bernard Riley
 Dom Um Romão

S 

 Bobby Sanabria
 Poncho Sanchez
 Mongo Santamaría
 Joe Saylor
 Steven Schick
 Rainer Seegers (timpani)
 Sheila E.
 Ramesh Shotham
 Rick Shutter
 Sivamani
 Stuart Saunders Smith
 Leigh Howard Stevens
 Eric Stuer
 Latyr Sy

T

 Crystal Taliefero
 Third Coast Percussion
 Cal Tjader
 Dudu Tucci
 Arto Tunçboyacıyan

U

 Ruth Underwood (Frank Zappa) (Marimba)

V

 David Van Tieghem
 Nana Vasconcelos
 Glen Velez
 Tommy Vig
 Paolo Vinaccia
 T. H. Vinayakram

W

 Stokley Williams (1989–present) (Mint Condition)

Y

 Stomu Yamashta

Z

 Zakir Hussain

Percussionists